Inquisitor pseudoprincipalis is a species of sea snail, a marine gastropod mollusk in the family Pseudomelatomidae, the turrids and allies.

There seems to be confusion about the accepted name of this species. According to the University of Tokyo, the accepted name is Crassispira pseudoprincipalis, while according to the World Register of Marine Species, the accepted name is Inquisitor pseudoprincipalis. Both rely on the basionym Pleurotoma (Drillia) pseudoprincipalis Yokoyama, 1920.

Description
The length of the shell attains 31.3 mm.

Distribution
This marine species occurs off Vietnam and in the Yellow Sea. Fossils were found in Pliocene strata in the Naganuma Formation at Kanagawa, Japan.

References

 Yokoyama, Matajiro. "Fossils from the Miura Peninsula and its immediate north." Journal of the College of Science, Tokyo Imperial University 39 (1920): 1-198.
 Taki, I. and Oyama, K., 1954: Matajiro Yokoyama's the Pliocene and later faunas from the Kwanto region in Japan. Palaeontological Society of Japan, Special Papers, no. 2, pp. 1–68, pls. 1–49.
 Oyama, K., 1973: Revision of Matajiro Yokoyama's type Mollusca from the Tertiary and Quaternary of the Kanto area. Palaeontological Society of Japan, Special Papers, no. 17, pp. 1–148, pls. 1–57
 Hylleberg, J. & Kilburn., R. N. 2003. Marine molluscs of Vietnam. Annotations, voucher material, and species in need of verification Phuket Marine Biological Center Special Publication 28: 1-300
 Liu J.Y. [Ruiyu] (ed.). (2008). Checklist of marine biota of China seas. China Science Press. 1267 pp.

External links
 Worldwide Mollusc Species Data Base: Inquisitor pseudoprincipalis

pseudoprincipalis
Gastropods described in 1920